Broadmoor Baptist Church was a Baptist church located in Memphis, Tennessee, affiliated with the Southern Baptist Convention. The church closed in 2012.

History 
In the latter part of 1959, a group met together to form a fellowship that was later to become a church. On March 13, 1960, the Broadmoor Chapel became the Broadmoor Baptist Church, a cooperating church with the Shelby Baptist Association, the Tennessee Baptist Convention, and the Southern Baptist Convention.
Dr. Ira Cole was the first pastor, serving from 1959 until 1972.

References 

Christian organizations established in 1959
Former Baptist church buildings in the United States